Paraguay national field hockey team may refer to:
 Paraguay men's national field hockey team
 Paraguay women's national field hockey team